A list of Spanish-produced and co-produced feature films released in the country in 1991. The domestic theatrical release date is favoured.

Films

See also 
 6th Goya Awards

References

External links
 Spanish films of 1991 at the Internet Movie Database

1991
Spanish
Films